Mahdi Kamil Shiltagh (born 6 January 1995 in Iraq) is an Iraqi midfielder who played for Al-Zawraa and the Iraq national football team.

Early career
The midfielder comes from a sporting background with his elder brother having been played at Al-Jaish while his three cousins Mohanad, Adnan and Ahmed Nassir were also footballers, Mohanad Nassir going onto play for Iraq's youth team and once played against Brazil. In 2007, Ahmed Nassir then of Al-Sinaa was hurt in a twin suicide bombing that took the lives of 80 Iraqis at the Al-Shourjah market in the city of Baghdad and his playing career was ended after his leg amputated from the hip down. His cousin Mohanad Nassir played against Brazil at the 2001 FIFA World Youth Championship in Argentina.
Mahdi began kicking a ball around his local shaabiya field for his local team Anwar Baghdad in Qataa (sector) 5 in Al-Sadr City, people would often tell him that he should try out for a club. The youngster who brushed away their calls but after one local game that changed when a team-mate of his decided to take it upon himself to take him to Al-Quwa Al-Jawiya for try-outs. His team-mate took him to the Air Force Club and Mahdi was picked after trials and won a title with the Al-Quwa Al-Jawiya Ishbal (“Cubs”) under Bashar Latif and Sami Shabib and progressed to the Under 17s under the supervision of Mohammed Nassir.

At 1.64 m (5 ft 4 1⁄2 inches), Mahdi always had his doubters even when he was called to the Under 17s, however the player the Al-Shorta fans call "Zola" after the tiny ex-Italy and Chelsea FC playmaker Gianfranco Zola, showed that he was more than capable of imposing himself on opponents in the Iraqi league despite his slight frame and lack of height. That belief in his own abilities, may come from his long-admiration for Catalan giants Barcelona and their brand of tiki-taka football, a style more reliant on passing and skill than on strength. A self-confessed Barça fan and an admirer of Andrés Iniesta who the Iraqi player calls a painter with the ball seemingly stuck to his feet and insists the Barcelona maestro does not merely kick a ball but cresses it, much like an artist's brush on a flat canvas and sees him on a completely different wavelength as a footballer even to Lionel Messi. Perfecting his own ball skills, Mahdi would spend hours observing Barcelona's No.8 and admitted he studied and learned how to pirouette on the ball from the Spanish genius.

Al-Shorta
With limited playing time at Al-Quwa Al-Jawiya, Mahdi decided it was time to move on and signed for Al-Shurta after he impressed officials Mohammed Khalaf and one of the club's coach Adnan Jafar. However, despite signing his first senior contract he never got a game and was placed in the youth team until coach Basim Qasim was appointed and Mahdi eventually made his full league debut. The player was forced to sit impatiently on the bench early on in his career, Mahdi often thought of quitting football, however his own mother advised him to be patient and it was the making of the midfielder, understanding that the coach needed him at specific moments in matches, to a change a game.

International career
On 14 August 2013 Mahdi made his first international cap with Iraq against Chile in a friendly match.

Honors

Clubs
Al-Shorta
 Iraqi Premier League: 2012–13, 2018–19
Al-Zawraa
 Iraqi Super Cup: 2021

International
Iraq U-20
 AFC U-19 Championship runner-up: 2012
 FIFA U-20 World Cup 4th Place: 2013
Iraq U-23
 2014 AFC U-22 Championship: Champions
Iraq 
 AFC Asian Cup fourth-place: 2015

International statistics

Iraq national team goals
Scores and results list Iraq's goal tally first.

References

External links
 
 

1995 births
Living people
Iraqi footballers
Iraq international footballers
Footballers at the 2014 Asian Games
2015 AFC Asian Cup players
Sportspeople from Baghdad
Association football midfielders
Asian Games medalists in football
Al-Shorta SC players
Footballers at the 2016 Summer Olympics
Olympic footballers of Iraq
Asian Games bronze medalists for Iraq
Medalists at the 2014 Asian Games